Aphelia ferrugana is a species of moth of the family Tortricidae. It is found in central and south-eastern Europe, the south-eastern part of European Russia, Ukraine, the Caucasus, Asia Minor, Syria, Iraq and Iran.

The wingspan is 19–23 mm. Adults are on wing from May to the end of July in one generation per year.

The larvae feed on Pulsatilla, Anemone and Ononis species.

References

Moths described in 1793
Aphelia (moth)
Moths of Europe
Moths of Asia